Tendai(天台宗) is a Japanese school of Mahayana Buddhism.

Tendai may also refer to:

Structures 

 Tendai Station, a monorail station in Chiba, Japan

People with the given name 

 Tendai Biti (born 1966), Zimbabwean politician
 Tendai Chatara (born 1991), Zimbabwean cricketer
 Tendai Chisoro (born 1988), Zimbabwean cricketer
 Tendai Chimusasa (born 1971), Zimbabwean long-distance runner
 Tendai Mtawarira (born 1985), South African rugby union player 
 Tendai Mukomberanwa (born 1974), Zimbabwean sculptor
 Tendai Mzungu (born 1986), Australian rules footballer

See also 
Tendayi
Tiantai (disambiguation), in Chinese

Shona given names